The Country Music Association Awards is a major awards show in country music, with one of the primary awards being the New Artist of the Year Award. This award honors artists who have achieved national prominence through their work and are voted to have great success in the genre going forward. The award was known as the Horizon Award from 1981 until 2007 when it received its current title. An artist can be nominated twice in the New Artist category before they become ineligible, although the point at which an artist received "national prominence" is decided by the Country Music Association and is often a source of debate amongst fans and media. The inaugural recipient of this award was Terri Gibbs and the most recent winner is Lainey Wilson.

Recipients

References

Country Music Association Awards